Marcel Seynaeve (24 December 1933 – 26 December 2015) was a Belgian racing cyclist. He rode in the 1963 Tour de France. He also won the 4th stage of the 1961 Vuelta a España.

Major results
1959
 10th Schaal Sels
1960
 7th Overall Dwars door België
1961
 1st Stage 4 Vuelta a España
1962
 3rd De Kustpijl
 6th Kuurne–Brussels–Kuurne
1964
 8th Circuit des Frontières

References

External links
 

1933 births
2015 deaths
Belgian male cyclists
People from Ichtegem
Belgian Vuelta a España stage winners
Cyclists from West Flanders